Nipholophia chujoi is a species of beetle in the family Cerambycidae, and the only species in the genus Nipholophia. It was described by Gressitt in 1951.

References

Pteropliini
Beetles described in 1951